Muniadona of Castile (1066), also called Mayor or Munia, was Queen of Pamplona (10111035) by her marriage with King Sancho Garcés III, who later added to his domains the Counties of Ribagorza (1017) and Castile (1028) using her dynastic rights to these territories.

Biography

Dynastic rights
Eldest child and daughter of Sancho García, Count of Castile and his wife Urraca, probably a member of the Banu Gómez family, she married King Sancho Garcés III of Pamplona before 27 June 1011 when both appear confirming certain privileges of the Monastery of San Millán.

In 1017, William Isarn, Count of Ribagorza was assassinated during an expedition to the Val d'Aran. William's illegitimacy had resulted in his claim to the county being challenged, and it had been partitioned between him and his cousin Mayor García, daughter of García Fernández of Castile by William's aunt, Ava de Ribagorza, along with her husband Count Raymond III of Pallars Jussà.  William's death without heirs led Mayor and Raymond to claim the entire county, but this was contested by Sancho Garcés III of Pamplona, asserting the dynastic rights of his wife Muniadona, who as eldest daughter of Mayor's brother, Count Sancho García, could claim to be the rightful heiress of her grandmother Ava, and hence of Ava's father Count Raymond II of Ribagorza.  In 1017 the troops of Sancho III invaded Ribagorza and he took control over William's half of the county, while the rest remained in the hands of Mayor García until 1025 when, having been repudiated by her husband, Mayor transferred most of the remainder to Sancho III, Raymond III only retaining the Noguera Ribagorçana basin. It may have been in recognition of this transfer that Muniadona adopted the name Mayor that she would sometimes use subsequently.

Again, in 1028, Muniadona's dynastic rights were invoked. Following the assassination of Count García Sánchez of Castile by the Vela family in León, Sancho III took control of Castile since his wife was the eldest sister of the late count. Their son Ferdinand Sánchez was named count in 1029.

Widowhood and testament

Muniadona outlived her husband and most of her children, except perhaps Jimena who was still alive in December 1063. After the death of her husband in 1035, Muniadona founded the monastery of San Martín de Tours de Frómista, and in her testament dated 13 June 1066, she requested to be buried there. She probably died shortly after executing her last will.

Her last will also "determined the definitive transfer of the horses that she had lent to those who enjoyed them until then. She also freed the Saracens who had converted to Christianity that were under her dependence. In addition, she declared the monastery of San Martín de Tours de Frómista owner of the estates that it had been exploiting and gave it other properties in Bobadilla and Agero, the thirds of the tithes of Frómista and Población de Campos, as well as a half meadow and a serna in Villota. She also divided her sheep, cows and horses in Frómista among the ecclesiastical centers of Santa María, San Juan Bautista and San Martín, and the cows she had in Asturias among the place of her burial, the monastery of San Martín de Tours de Frómista and the three monks who were in charge of praying for her soul".

Family and children
From her marriage to King Sancho Garcés were born:
 García Sánchez III, nicknamed "the one from Nájera", King of Pamplona from 1035 until his death in 1054 and married to Stephanie of Foix.
 Fernando Sánchez, King of León married to Sancha of León.
 Gonzalo Sánchez, petty King of Sobrarbe and Ribagorza.
 Jimena Sánchez, queen consort of León by her marriage to Bermudo III.

Notes

References

Bibliography

 
 
 
 
 
 
 
 
 
 
 

|-

Year of birth unknown
11th-century deaths
11th-century people from the Kingdom of Pamplona
11th-century Spanish women
Hispanic empresses and queens
Navarrese royal consorts
Spanish countesses
Counts of Castile